The Baluchi horse is a breed of horse native to the Baluchistan, Sindh and Punjab Provinces in Pakistan. It is also found in Sistan and Baluchistan of Iran. They are best recognized by their turned in ears, which resemble those of the Kathiawari horse of India.

Characteristics 
The Baluchi horse is usually bay, chestnut, or gray. They are light in build and generally have a fine head, long neck, strong but fine legs and ears that curve in so the tips of the ears touch. The Baluchi somewhat resembles the Indian Kathiawari breed. They are also thought to be related to the Barb through the Malian breed known as the Beledougou or Banamba. Their average height is 14 hands.  Due to diluted bloodlines, horses of pure Baluchi lineage are extremely rare today.

Uses 
They are used for riding, light draft work, and pulling tangas.

References

Horse breeds
Horse breeds originating in Pakistan
Economy of Balochistan, Pakistan